The Central District of Arak County is a district (bakhsh) in Arak County, Markazi Province, Iran. At the 2006 census, its population (including those portions later split off to form Farahan County) was 543,859, in 150,880 families; excluding those portions, the populations was 535,449, in 148,646 families.  The District has five cities: Arak, Davudabad, Senjan, Karchan and Karahrud. The District has eight rural districts (dehestan): Amanabad Rural District, Amiriyeh Rural District, Davudabad Rural District, Mashhad-e Miqan Rural District, Masumiyeh Rural District, Moshkabad Rural District, Sedeh Rural District, and Shamsabad Rural District.

References 

Arak County
Districts of Markazi Province